The Franklin Athletic Club of Cleveland was a short-lived professional football team based in Cleveland, Ohio from 1903 until around 1909. Franklin played against in "Ohio League" against the early Canton Bulldogs, Shelby Blues and Massillon Tigers. In 1904 the Tigers defeated Franklin 56-6.

The team's most notable player was Peggy Parratt, one of the pioneers of the forward pass, who played with Franklin briefly in 1907.

References

American football teams established in 1903
American football teams disestablished in 1909
Ohio League teams
American football teams in Cleveland
Early professional American football teams in Ohio
Defunct American football teams in Ohio
1900s establishments in Ohio
1909 disestablishments in Ohio